Villasante is a surname. Notable people with the surname include:

 Jesús Villasante
 Jorge Villasante (born 1962), Peruvian politician

See also
 Villasanti